

77001–77100 

|-id=044
| 77044 Galera-Rosillo ||  || Rebeca Galera-Rosillo (1988–2020) was a promising young Spanish scientist who earned her masters in astrophysics from the University of La Laguna. At the time of her death, she was close to defending her doctoral research on planetary nebulae at the Instituto de Astrofisica de Canarias. || 
|}

77101–77200 

|-id=136
| 77136 Mendillo ||  || Michael Mendillo (born 1944), American professor of astronomy and electrical engineering at Boston University || 
|-id=138
| 77138 Puiching || 2001 EN || Pui Ching Middle School, Hong Kong. It was founded in 1889. || 
|-id=185
| 77185 Cherryh ||  || C. J. Cherryh (born 1942), an American science fiction and fantasy writer || 
|}

77201–77300 

|-bgcolor=#f2f2f2
| colspan=4 align=center | 
|}

77301–77400 

|-id=318
| 77318 Danieltsui ||  || Daniel C. Tsui (born 1939), Chinese-American physicist and Nobelist, a graduate of Pui Ching Middle School in Hong Kong (see ) || 
|}

77401–77500 

|-id=441
| 77441 Jouve || 2001 HU || Jacques Jouve (born 1929), involved in the construction of the Observatory of Saint-Veran, a station of the Paris Observatory that studies the solar corona, in the French Alps || 
|}

77501–77600 

|-id=560
| 77560 Furusato ||  || Furusato is a well-known song in Japan. The word also means "country home". || 
|}

77601–77700 

|-id=621
| 77621 Koten ||  || Pavel Koten (born 1972), a staff astronomer at the Astronomical Institute of the Academy of Sciences of the Czech Republic. || 
|-id=696
| 77696 Patriciann ||  || Patricia Ann Clingan (born 1949), wife of amateur astronomer Roy Clingan who discovered this minor planet || 
|}

77701–77800 

|-id=755
| 77755 Delémont ||  || Delémont, Switzerland, where the Jurassien-Vicques Observatory is situated || 
|}

77801–77900 

|-id=856
| 77856 Noblitt ||  || Niles Noblitt (born 1951), American member of the board of trustees of the Rose-Hulman Institute and loyal supporter of the Rose-Hulman Observatory, where this minor planet was discovered || 
|-id=870
| 77870 MOTESS || 2001 SM || MOTESS (Moving Object and Transient Event Search System), using three 0.35-meter reflecting telescopes, operating in Tucson, Arizona, that has observed and discovered small Solar System objects || 
|}

77901–78000 

|-id=971
| 77971 Donnolo ||  || Shabbethai Donnolo (913–982), an Italian physician, medical author and astrologer/astronomer || 
|}

References 

077001-078000